Gérard Cournoyer (18 April 1912 – 11 November 1973) was a Liberal party member of the House of Commons of Canada. He was born in Sorel, Quebec and became a lawyer by career.

Cournoyer studied at the Saint Hyacinthe Seminary, then attended the University of Montreal where he received his Bachelor of Arts and Bachelor of Laws degrees. He was called to the Quebec bar in 1935.

He was first elected to Parliament at the Richelieu—Verchères riding in a by-election on 23 December 1946 then re-elected there in the 1949 federal election.

Cournoyer resigned his House of Commons seat on 5 July 1952 during his term in the 21st Canadian Parliament to pursue provincial politics in Quebec where he won a Legislative Assembly seat in the Richelieu riding later that year in the 1952 Quebec election. He was defeated in 1956, but was elected again in 1960 and again in 1962. From 1960 to 1964, he was Minister of Transport and Communication under the Jean Lesage administration, then was minister of Hunting and Fishing until 1965, then a minister without portfolio until his election defeat in 1966.

References

External links
 

1912 births
1973 deaths
Liberal Party of Canada MPs
Members of the House of Commons of Canada from Quebec
Lawyers in Quebec
Quebec Liberal Party MNAs
Université de Montréal alumni
People from Sorel-Tracy
20th-century Canadian lawyers